The Miss South Dakota Teen USA competition is the pageant that selects the representative for the state of South Dakota in the Miss Teen USA pageant and the name of the title held by that winner.

South Dakota's highest placement was in 1986 when Valerie Marsden placed 4th runner-up to Allison Brown of Oklahoma. Their most recent placement was in 2016, when Makenzie Falcon placed in the top 15.

Four Miss South Dakota Teen USA titleholders have won the Miss South Dakota USA pageant and competed at Miss USA.  In 2016, Miss South Dakota Teen USA 2014 Madison McKeown became the first representative of South Dakota to place at the Miss USA pageant since the 1970s.

The pageant was first held in 1982 to select a winner to represent the state at Miss Teen USA 1983.  It has been directed by Future Productions since 2002 and is a subsidiary of the Miss Universe Organization. It has been held in Sioux Falls, Aberdeen, Rapid City, Pierre, Brookings, and Brandon.

The current titleholder is Bella Welker of Sioux Falls was crowned on April 9, 2022 at Watertown Event Center in Watertown. She will represent South Dakota for the title of Miss Teen USA 2021 in November 2022.

Results summary

Placements
4th runners-up: Valerie Marsden (1986)
Top 10: Lisa Williamson (1989)
Top 15: Makenzie Falcon (2016)
South Dakota holds a record of 3 placements at Miss Teen USA.

Winners 

1 Age at the time of the Miss Teen USA pageant

References

External links
Official website

South Dakota
Women in South Dakota